California Proposition 61 may refer to:

 California Proposition 61 (2004)
 California Proposition 61 (2016)